Destiny Waltz may refer to:
A composition by Sydney Baynes
A novel by Gerda Charles